Saša Kajkut (Serbian Cyrillic: Саша Кајкут; born 7 July 1984) is a Bosnian retired professional footballer who played as a striker.

Club career
As a teenager, Kajkut played for hometown team Omladinac Banja Luka, after which he moved to Borac Banja Luka where he started his professional career. After that, Kajkut played for Croatian 2. HNL teams Zadar and Pomorac.

One of his remarkable memorable moment in his career is connected to the 2nd leg match for Sheriff Tiraspol against a team from Andorra in the 2007–08 UEFA Champions League first qualifying round. He first passed the ball to Wilfried Balima for scoring Sheriff's lead of 0–1 in the 68th minute (just 3 minutes after he entered the game), and then scored his first goal for the new team in the 77th minute. Kajkut created history in just 12 minutes, as he became the first ever player from Banja Luka scoring in an official Champions League match. With this extraordinary performance he became one of the favourite players for Sheriff fans though he only stayed there for one single season after that game.

After Sheriff, Kajkut went back to Borac, after which he played for Baku, again for Borac and Čelik Zenica. On 31 December 2013, he signed with South China permanently after a successful trial.

On 18 August 2015, PAE Kerkyra, for who Kajkut played at the time, was dismissed by Superleague Greece for fake shareholds transfers. The club got relegated to Football League and Kajkut was eventually released by the club. He was approached directly Veria and agreed to join it on 19 August 2015. His yearly wages at Veria were €100,000. Kajkut was officially announced as Veria's player on 28 August 2015. He debuted on 12 September 2015, in a 3–0 home defeat against PAOK. He scored his first goal for Veria with a penalty kick in a Greek Cup match against Atromitos. After Varia, Kajkut once again went back to Bosnia and played for Krupa, Zrinjski Mostar and Željezničar.

In June 2018, for a fourth time in his career, Kajkut signed with Borac. In the 2018–19 First league of RS season, with Borac, he won the league title and got promoted back to the Bosnian Premier League. Kajkut finished his career at Borac in January 2021.

International career
Kajkut made his first and only international appearance for Bosnia and Herzegovina on 1 June 2009, a 0–0 away friendly match draw against Uzbekistan, coming in as a 46th minute substitute for Emir Hadžić.

Honours
Sheriff Tiraspol 
Divizia Națională: 2007–08
Moldovan Super Cup: 2007

Borac Banja Luka 
First League of RS: 2018–19
Republika Srpska Cup: 2008–09, 2011–12

South China
Hong Kong Senior Challenge Shield: 2013–14

Zrinjski Mostar
Bosnian Premier League: 2016–17

Željezničar
Bosnian Cup: 2017–18

Individual
Awards
Bosnian Premier League Player of the Season: 2012–13

References

External links

1984 births
Living people
Sportspeople from Banja Luka
Association football forwards
Bosnia and Herzegovina footballers
Bosnia and Herzegovina international footballers
FK Borac Banja Luka players
NK Karlovac players
NK Zadar players
NK Pomorac 1921 players
FC Sheriff Tiraspol players
FC Baku players
NK Čelik Zenica players
South China AA players
PAE Kerkyra players
Veria F.C. players
FK Krupa players
HŠK Zrinjski Mostar players
FK Željezničar Sarajevo players
Premier League of Bosnia and Herzegovina players
First Football League (Croatia) players
Moldovan Super Liga players
Azerbaijan Premier League players
Hong Kong First Division League players
Super League Greece players
First League of the Republika Srpska players
Bosnia and Herzegovina expatriate footballers
Expatriate footballers in Croatia
Bosnia and Herzegovina expatriate sportspeople in Croatia
Expatriate footballers in Moldova
Bosnia and Herzegovina expatriate sportspeople in Moldova
Expatriate footballers in Azerbaijan
Bosnia and Herzegovina expatriate sportspeople in Azerbaijan
Expatriate footballers in Hong Kong
Bosnia and Herzegovina expatriate sportspeople in Hong Kong
Expatriate footballers in Greece
Bosnia and Herzegovina expatriate sportspeople in Greece